Inspector is a 1968 Indian Malayalam-language film, directed by M. Krishnan Nair and produced by P. I. M. Kasim. The film stars Prem Nazir, Adoor Bhasi, Thikkurissy Sukumaran Nair and Prameela. The film had musical score by M. S. Baburaj.

Cast
Prem Nazir
Adoor Bhasi
Thikkurissy Sukumaran Nair
Prameela
G. K. Pillai
Jyothi Lakshmi
K. P. Ummer
Kaduvakulam Antony
Udaya Chandrika

Soundtrack
The music was composed by M. S. Baburaj and the lyrics were written by P. Bhaskaran.

References

External links
 

1968 films
1960s Malayalam-language films
Films directed by M. Krishnan Nair